Philip Mangula is a Tanzanian politician and civil servant most notably acknowledged by being long-term vice chairman Chama Cha Mapinduzi.

References

Living people
Chama Cha Mapinduzi politicians
1941 births